James Cooke (born 3 March 1991) is a British modern pentathlete.  Cooke is both the 2018 World and 2019 European champion in the individual event, and the 2019 European Champion in the Team event with Tom Toolis and Joe Choong.

In 2022 Cooke announced about his retirement as pentathlete and new career as the head coach for Greek modern pentathlon national team.

Career
Cooke competed at the 2016 Summer Olympics in Rio de Janeiro, in the men's event, where he finished 14th.

At the 2018 World Modern Pentathlon Championships held in Mexico City, Cooke overtook Valentin Prades who had celebrated too early to finish in first place. He also won a team silver together with Joe Choong and Myles Pillage.

In 2019, at the European Championships held in Bath, Somerset, Cooke won a gold in the individual event. He also won a team gold with Choong and Tom Toolis.

In 2021, Cooke competed at the delayed 2020 Summer Olympics in Tokyo, Japan in the Men's event. He finished 9th in the event won by his teammate Joe Choong.

References

External links

1991 births
Living people
British male modern pentathletes
Olympic modern pentathletes of Great Britain
Modern pentathletes at the 2016 Summer Olympics
World Modern Pentathlon Championships medalists
Team Bath pentathletes
Modern pentathletes at the 2020 Summer Olympics
Modern pentathlon coaches